Coolidge is a village and community in Saint George Parish, Antigua and Barbuda.

Demographics 
Coolidge has one enumeration district, ED 41900 Coolidge, the enumeration district is "high-income" and has an income weight of 3.18, the village had a population of 267 in 2011.

Census Data 
Source:

References 

Saint George Parish, Antigua and Barbuda
Populated places in Antigua and Barbuda